is a professional Japanese baseball player. He is a pitcher for the Hanshin Tigers of Nippon Professional Baseball (NPB).

References 

2000 births
Living people
Nippon Professional Baseball pitchers
Baseball people from Kanagawa Prefecture
Hanshin Tigers players
People from Zushi, Kanagawa